The Gambia Workers' Union (GWU) was a general trade union in Gambia.

History
The GWU was founded in 1956 by M.E. Jallow, the organisation's first Secretary General, and officially registered in July 1958. Initially organising workers in the construction sector, the union grew in the late 1950s following successful actions with dock workers who won improved wages and bonuses.  In 1959, the union merged with the Gambia Labour Union (GLU), although this merger was annulled shortly afterwards over differences towards independence and international trade union relations. In 1977, the government withdrew the union's certificate of registration following a failure to submit accounts.

See also
Alieu Ebrima Cham Joof
Bathurst Trade Union

References

Trade unions in the Gambia
Trade unions established in 1956
1956 establishments in the British Empire